Lachnocnema brunea is a butterfly in the family Lycaenidae. It is found in Cameroon, the Democratic Republic of the Congo, Uganda, north-western Tanzania, and western Kenya.

References

Butterflies described in 1996
Miletinae
Taxa named by Michel Libert